Nob Hill Business Center is a historic shopping center in Albuquerque, New Mexico. Built in 1946–7, it was the first modern suburban shopping center in New Mexico, and its construction marked a shift away from pedestrian-oriented development in Albuquerque in favor of decentralized, auto-oriented sprawl. Located on Central Avenue (former U.S. Route 66) at Carlisle Boulevard, the building is the focal point of the Nob Hill district.

The shopping center was developed by Robert Waggoman on what was then the eastern fringe of the city, more than two miles from the downtown commercial district. Local commentators dubbed the project "Waggoman's Folly" because it was so far from the center of town, but the shopping center turned out to be a major success and served as a model for future commercial development in Albuquerque. The building was added to the New Mexico State Register of Cultural Properties in 1983 and the National Register of Historic Places in 1994.

Nob Hill Business Center is a one-story, U-shaped building with an interior parking lot facing Central Avenue. The building was designed by Louis Hesselden in a predominantly Streamline Moderne style with rounded corners, decorative towers, and white stucco walls with horizontal bands of terra cotta tile and brick. Some of the architectural features are also reminiscent of the local Territorial Revival style.

References

Buildings and structures in Albuquerque, New Mexico
Commercial buildings on the National Register of Historic Places in New Mexico
Shopping malls established in 1947
Buildings and structures on U.S. Route 66
Streamline Moderne architecture in New Mexico
New Mexico State Register of Cultural Properties
1947 establishments in New Mexico
National Register of Historic Places in Albuquerque, New Mexico